Live at the Googolplex is a live album by American rock band Clutch, compiled from various live recordings on the Pure Rock Fury tour. Sources differ on the album's recording dates. According to some sources, it was recorded in Chicago (tracks 1–4, 12 & 13); Montreal (tracks 5, 6, 10 & 11); Kansas City (tracks 7–9) and Columbus, Ohio (tracks 14 & 15) on the tour dates of February 19 & 21, March 1 & 2 in 2002 and in early 2003, on the Pure Rock Fury North American tour; but it could also have been from 2001 and 2002 era recordings.

Track listing

Personnel 
 Neil Fallon – vocals
 Tim Sult – guitar
 Dan Maines – bass
 Jean-Paul Gaster – drums

Production
 Produced by Clutch
 Recorded by Lee Britnail
 Mixed by Greg Clark
 Mastered by Lawrence Packer

References 

Clutch (band) live albums
2003 live albums